The women's javelin throw event at the 1932 Olympic Games took place July 31.  This was the first time this event was held for women.

Results

Final standings

Key: OR = Olympic record

References

Women's javelin throw
Javelin throw at the Olympics
1932 in women's athletics
Ath